The Schütte-Lanz SL 11 was a German military dirigible  built in 1916 by Luftschiffbau Schütte-Lanz. It was the 
first German airship to be shot down while bombing England.

Operational history

The SL 11 was based at Spich and commanded by Hauptmann Wilhelm Schramm. In the early hours of 3 September 1916, after jettisoning bombs over Essendon, Hertfordshire, destroying several houses, damaging a church, and killing two sisters aged 26 & 12,  it was attacked over Hertfordshire by Lt. William Leefe Robinson flying a BE 2C using incendiary ammunition. It crashed at Cuffley, killing the entire crew, who were buried at Potters Bar Cemetery; they were re-interred at Cannock Chase German Military Cemetery in 1962. Robinson was awarded the Victoria Cross.

Specifications

First Flight: 1 August 1916
Length: 
Diameter: 
Gas Capacity: 
Performance: 
Payload: 
Engines: 4x Maybach HS-Lu 6-cyl in-line engines: total

See also 
 List of Schütte-Lanz airships

References 

 

Airships of Germany
History of St Albans
1916 ships
Rigid airships
Aircraft first flown in 1916
Four-engined pusher aircraft